Delhi Public School Rohini (DPS Rohini) is a school located in Rohini, New Delhi, Delhi, India.  The school was established on 3 July 1995 under the aegis of the Delhi Public School Society. The school began with 250 students in borrowed premises off DPS Mathura Road, with eight teachers and June Fernandes as the founder head mistress. The principal is Vibha Singh. It has about 2000 students.

Every year, Delhi Public School Rohini has sent its outgoing pupils to several institutions of repute, ranging from IIT's, BITS Pilani, AIIMS (All India Institute of Medical Sciences), SRCC in India to Stanford University, Carnegie Mellon University, University of California, University of Illinois, University of Texas and Sarah Lawrence College, USA, University of Nottingham, UK and other institutions.

The school is rated 4.4 out of 5 as per Rating and Reviews available on SchoolMyKids.com.

The school has a multimedia lab, canteen, two libraries, a gym, computer labs, physics, chemistry and biology labs. The school has installed Educomp smart class in all the classes up to 12th standard, as well as a higher-order thinking skills lab called THOTS. Apart from all the usual sports like cricket, football, badminton, etc. The school also conducts an annual NASA trip and several exchange programmes from countries like Germany and France. It has its own cabinet system in both senior and junior schools, a MUN society called 'DPSRMUN', a computer club called 'XINO', a Maths club called "Vortex", a Quizzing club called 'Infinity', a Commerce Club called 'BIZECO' and a Newspaper club called 'Folio'.

XINO — Extreme Innovation 
The computer club of DPS Rohini was founded by Dev Dua and Shivam Agarwal. It has more than 25 members. XINO completed 10 years in April 2020.

It hosts an annual symposium which has become one of the most awaited events of the year.

The Presidents of the club are Siddhant Singh and Pranjal Tiwari.

Vortex — Math Club 
The math club of DPS Rohini was founded by S. Aditya, Aditya Deshmukh, Jatin Singh, Yuvam Kulkarni, Mehul Arora, Kunal Jain, Archi Kaushik and Palash Taneja in 2016.

It held the first edition of its symposium, Vortex 2017, three years ago.

The second edition of Vortex was organized in June 2020.

The third edition was held on 31 July and 1 August 2021. The club is looking forward to planning symposia annually.

The current Presidents of the club are Jubin Singh and Akshit Gupta. The Vice Presidents are Manit Kaushik and Shaurya Bajaj.

DPSRMUN 
The Model United Nations society of Delhi Public School Rohini possesses a nine year old legacy in the arena of Model United Nations
conferences. With a motto of 'Concordia Discors' students of the society have won awards in most of the major conferences held across the country and overseas including the Ivy League Model UN Conference and Harvard Model UN Conference.

Model United Nations is an indispensable part of the school's extracurricular calendar. The society provides the students with an opportunity to understand world politics and how the United Nations and its agencies function.

The first Intra-School Model United Nations was organized by the Batch of 2013–2014, which led to the school organizing the first ever DPSR MUN 2014 and with a second edition organized in 2015. The club had organised an inter-school Model United Nations in 2020. The club currently has the following members: Hitanshi Gupta, Mrityunjay Sharma, Nakul Krishan Sood, Shaurya Kapoor, Gaurish Chawla and Viraj Singh.

BIZECO 
DPS Rohini founded its first commerce club- BIZECO in 2014. Proud of its logo and tagline "Mind your own business", this club hosted its premiere inter school competition in October 2015. The event was a huge success with enthusiastic participating from the top schools from all around Delhi NCR. The main aim of this club is to give the students exposure of commercial aspects of life and providing them with the knowledge of the modern day world. BIZECO also inculcates values and ethical ways of conducting business among the students via its multiple events and simulators. Known for its amazing ideas and advanced technology used in the events, the club possesses the finest events any commerce club may have in the capital ranging from stock market evaluation and barter system to entrepreneurship! As the technology gets advanced day by day, BIZECO adapts to the new technology to make its events more futuristic.

BIZECO has become one of the most esteemed commerce events in Delhi-NCR region. After many successful editions, the club hosted its second online edition in 2021.

Folio 
Folio is the newspaper club of Delhi Public School started in 2022 by Dia Buttan. The club provides its members with a community where they can express themselves through their words. With 30+ members, the club released its first physical edition in December 2022 which was circulated to the students and teachers of the school. Folio aims to inculcate qualities of leadership and team work in its members through the integrated working of the students. The newspaper has a number of columns ranging from Just Ask Us! (the advisory column), Fun-O-Topia (the fun column), Bizcommerce (the business column) to Inside Out (the roving reporter column). From writing the content to the designing and editing of the newspaper, it is all done by the students under the supervision of the teachers. 

The club has an Instagram account which has updates on the newspaper and its sneak peeks, reachable at @folio.dpsr

Infinity 
The Quizzing club of DPS Rohini, Infinity was founded in October 2015 by Sayan Chaudhry and Mehul Arora

References

External links 

Schools in Delhi
Delhi Public School Society
Educational institutions established in 1995
1995 establishments in Delhi